This is a sourced index of commercial, indie and freeware space flight simulation games. The list is categorized into four sections: space flight simulators, space flight simulators with an added element of combat, space combat simulators with an added element of trading, and unreleased space flight simulators.

A space flight simulator game is software that allows the operator to experience spacecraft space flight in outer space with the added elements of gameplay. There are many different types of simulators. These simulators range in purpose from pure simulation to sheer entertainment. Space flight occurs beyond the Earth's atmosphere, and space flight simulators feature the ability to roll, pitch, and yaw. Space flight simulators use flight dynamics in a free environment; this free environment lets the spacecraft move within the three-dimensional coordinate system or the x, y, and z (applicate) axis.

See Lists of video games for related lists.

Space flight simulation games

Space flight simulation games under development

Cancelled space flight simulation games

Space combat games

Space trading and space combat games

See also 
Space flight simulation game
Planetarium software
List of observatory software

References 

Space flight simulation game
Timelines of video games